Topray Solar is a vertically integrated solar energy company with global presences in Africa, Europe, Asia and North America. It is a publicly listed company on China Shenzhen Stock Exchange (Stock Ticker: 002218) with a market cap over 1 Billion USD. Topray Solar is a first-tier player in the renewable energy industry with multiple manufacturing bases and several oversea subsidiaries.

Products
Topray Solar is a fully vertically integrated solar manufacture and distribution company with a variety of product lines from crystalline solar cells & modules, thin film solar modules, solar stand alone systems to ultra clear PV glass. Started since 1992 as the No. 1 thin film PV module manufacturer in China, Topray engaged both mono crystalline and poly crystalline production from 2005, becoming the most diversified solar manufacturer in China ever since.

Consumer solar products are also a big category of Topray Solar's product lines. It designs and manufactures consumer solar products for residential application. Its products have been sold in global supermarkets such as Walmart and Home Depot in United States, Canadian Tire in Canada, Netto and Conrad in Germany.

Vertical integration
Topray Solar is the most vertically integrated company in solar industry. For Crystalline Modules, Topray Solar produces silicon ingots, wafers, crystalline solar cells and crystalline solar modules; For Thin Film Solar Modules, Topray Solar manufactures from ultra white conductive glass to final amorphous solar modules.

Building integrated photovoltaics
Topray Solar's building integrated amorphous solar module technology received the "Blue Sky Award" from the United Nations.

Global subsidiary companies
Germany—Topray Solar GmbH, Frankfurt am Main, Germany
United States—Topray Power Inc.
Africa—ASE Solar, Uganda and Kenya

See also
Photovoltaics
Building-integrated photovoltaics
Solar energy
Solar panel

References

 Topray Solar IPO

Solar energy companies
Companies based in Shenzhen
Chinese companies established in 1999
Electrical engineering companies
Engineering companies of China
Photovoltaics manufacturers
Solar energy companies of China
Chinese brands